Lethbridge is a railway station on the Geelong-Ballarat railway line located in the township of Lethbridge, Victoria, Australia. Currently freight trains pass the station, but no V/Line passenger trains.

The main bluestone station building is boarded up. Some of the ancillary weatherboard buildings are in a semi-derelict state.

External links

Disused railway stations in Victoria (Australia)